La vida difícil de una mujer fácil ("The Difficult Life of an Easy Woman") is a 1979 Mexican film. It stars Sara García.

External links
 

1979 films
Mexican mystery films
1970s Spanish-language films
1970s Mexican films